Edward W. Fasholé-Luke (born 1934) is a Sierra Leone Creole Anglican theologian.

Biography 
Born in 1934 in Freetown, Sierra Leone, Fasholé-Luke received a BA in general studies from Fourah Bay College (1959). He went for further studies in the United Kingdom, pursuing a BA in theology from St John's College, Durham (1963) and being ordained an Anglican priest in Durham. He then completed a PhD in theology from King's College, Aberdeen (1969), studying with Andrew Walls in the Centre for the Study of Christianity in the Non-Western World and writing a PhD thesis on "The Doctrine of the Church in the Writings of St. Cyprian of Carthage."

After his studies, Fasholé-Luke returned to Sierra Leone and taught theology at Fourah Bay College, beginning in 1969, and serving as its senior chaplain since 1985.  He maintained his interest in biblical and patristic studies, but also worked on developing an African Christian theology that was relevant to the social and political setting of West Africa.

Works

Books

Articles

References 

1934 births
Anglican theologians
Sierra Leonean Anglicans
Sierra Leone Creole people
World Christianity scholars
Fourah Bay College alumni
Academic staff of Fourah Bay College
Living people
People from Freetown